Ticket to Paradise is a 2022 romantic comedy film starring George Clooney and Julia Roberts as a divorced couple who team up to sabotage the impending wedding of their daughter in Bali. The film is directed by Ol Parker and written by Parker and Daniel Pipski, while Kaitlyn Dever, Billie Lourd, Maxime Bouttier, and Lucas Bravo also star.

Ticket to Paradise had its world premiere in Barcelona on September 8, 2022, and was released in the United Kingdom on September 20 and in the United States on October 21, by Universal Pictures and Working Title Films. It has grossed $172 million worldwide and received mixed reviews from critics.

Plot
David and Georgia Cotton are a many years divorced couple who hate each other and regret their marriage, which ended 20 years earlier. Their daughter Lily graduates from law school, and goes on vacation to Bali with her friend and fellow graduate Wren. While snorkeling off the coast, their tour boat leaves them behind, and they are rescued by a young Balinese seaweed farmer named Gede. That night, Lily and Gede hit it off. A month later, Lily emails David and Georgia to let them know that she and Gede are getting married, and she is staying in Bali permanently, giving up her legal career before it begins. David and Georgia form a truce to try and convince Lily that she is rushing into things and making the same mistake that they had made. Their pilot on the flight to Bali turns out to be Paul, Georgia's boyfriend, who arranged to fly this flight and return to visit Georgia in Bali a few days later, as a surprise.

David and Georgia give their verbal blessing to Lily and Gede, but secretly plan a "Trojan horse" strategy to sabotage the wedding from within. Their scheme includes stealing the couple's wedding rings, which the couple quickly replaces. Gede immediately suspects David and Georgia, but hides his suspicions from Lily. While carrying out this plan, David and Georgia begin to mend fences with one another. They also get to know Gede and his large extended family and come to see that he really does care for Lily. Paul shows up and surprises Georgia with a series of marriage proposals, the first of which is interrupted by a snake bite at the temple of Tanah Lot, and the second proposal is prevented by an accidental head-butt.

When Lily discovers the stolen rings, she demands that they get on board with the wedding or go home. She also confronts Gede, who had simultaneously confessed his harbored suspicions toward David and Georgia stealing the rings. David and Georgia realize that they will lose Lily forever if they do not support her decision, and they decide to offer their support. The wedding proceeds in accordance with Balinese custom. As the couple prepares to ceremonially stab a dagger through a pandan-leaf mat to complete the bond of marriage, Gede pauses the wedding ceremony to ask David and Georgia to give their blessing sincerely this time, offering not to go through with it unless they agree. David stands up and says that the couple has their blessing, but that they do not really need it, and if he and Georgia had listened to all of their own detractors (David's friends and Georgia's parents, respectively), they never would have had Lily. However their marriage turned out, they are both happier in a world with Lily in it. Lily and Gede are touched, and they complete the ceremony and get married.

On the morning after the wedding, Georgia tells Paul that she cannot marry him, and they end their relationship. David and Georgia toy with romance again, even kissing each other once, before pulling away and laughing about it. David, Georgia, and Wren exchange tearful goodbyes with Lily and board a boat to leave. David and Georgia consider their romantic prospects again, debating aloud whether they are too old to feel young again, and when they might return to Bali. In a flash, they both decide to stay, jumping off the boat to return to the dock.

Cast

Gede's father and mother, Wayan and Suli, are played by Agung Pindha and Ifa Barry, respectively. Gede's sister, Losi, is played by Cintya Dharmayanti.

Production

Ticket to Paradise is a co-production between Working Title Films, Smokehouse Pictures, and Red Om Films. Ol Parker and Daniel Pipski wrote the screenplay, and Parker directed. The film was announced by Universal Pictures on February 26, 2021. It reunites actors George Clooney and Julia Roberts after previously working on Ocean's Eleven (2001), Confessions of a Dangerous Mind (2002), Ocean's Twelve (2004), and Money Monster (2016). Deadline Hollywood noted Universal's reluctance to sell the distributor rights to a streaming service in the midst of the COVID-19 pandemic and said it was "important to those wondering when film studios are going to stop selling pricey star packages to streamers". Billie Lourd joined the cast in March; Kaitlyn Dever was added to the cast in April; and Lucas Bravo was revealed to star in October. Clooney used a Keto-based regimen to lose weight in preparation for his role.

Principal photography took place in Queensland, Australia, between November 2021 and February 2022. Ole Bratt Birkeland was the cinematographer. The film received a grant of AU$6.4 million (US$4.92 million) from the Australian federal government. Paul Fletcher, the Australian Minister for Communications and the Arts, said the production generated at least 270 jobs and AU$47 million (US$36.2 million) for the local economy. Filming locations included the Whitsunday Islands, the HOTA gallery at the Gold Coast, Brisbane Airport, cane fields near Norwell, Tamborine National Park, Queen's Wharf, Brisbane, Hamilton Island Airport, Carrara Markets, Tangalooma Island Resort on Moreton Island, and the Palm Bay Resort on Long Island. Scene where Georgia and David come to the island was shot on the Kate's cove beach, Haslewood Island. Production was briefly put in hiatus in January 2022 due to the rise of COVID-19 cases in Queensland.

During post-production, Lorne Balfe composed the film's score.

Release
Universal Pictures released the film theatrically in Australia on September 15, 2022. It was released in the United Kingdom on September 20, 2022, and was released in the United States on October 21, 2022. It was originally set to be released in the US on September 30, 2022. The death of Queen Elizabeth II in September 2022 delayed the film's UK release from September 16 to September 20. The film began streaming on Peacock 45 days after its theatrical debut in the US.

The film was released for VOD platforms on November 8, 2022, followed by a Blu-ray and DVD on December 13, 2022.

Reception

Box office
Ticket to Paradise has grossed $68.3 million in the United States and Canada, and $103.8 million in other territories, for a worldwide total of $172.1 million.

In the United States and Canada, Ticket to Paradise was released alongside Black Adam, and was projected to gross $12–15 million from 3,500 theaters in its opening weekend. The film made $6.4 million on its first day, including $1.1 million from Thursday night previews. It went on to debut to $16.3 million, finishing second behind Black Adam. The slight over-performance was attributed to the film skewing to older women amid the release of other titles (including Black Adam and Halloween Ends) being aimed at young men. In its sophomore weekend the film made $10 million, remaining in second, before finishing third place in its third weekend with $8.6 million (dropping 40% and 14%, respectively).

The film opened in seven markets ahead of its US release, grossing $800,000 from Spain and $700,000 from Brazil over their opening weekends on September 9–11.

Critical response
  Audiences polled by CinemaScore gave the film an average grade of "A−" on an A+ to F scale, while PostTrak reported that filmgoers gave it an 81% overall positive score, with 65% saying that they would definitely recommend it.

Accolades
At the 2022 People's Choice Awards, the film was nominated for Comedy Movie of 2022, and Julia Roberts was nominated for Comedy Movie Star of 2022.

References

External links
 
 

2020s American films
2020s British films
2020s English-language films
2022 romantic comedy films
American romantic comedy films
British romantic comedy films
Comedy of remarriage films
Film productions suspended due to the COVID-19 pandemic
Films about divorce
Films about families
Films about vacationing
Films about weddings
Films directed by Ol Parker
Films produced by Eric Fellner
Films produced by Tim Bevan
Films scored by Lorne Balfe
Films set in Bali
Films set in Chicago
Films set in Los Angeles
Films shot in Brisbane
Films shot in Queensland
Films shot on the Gold Coast, Queensland
Smokehouse Pictures films
Universal Pictures films
Working Title Films films